The Mount Data forest frog (Platymantis subterrestris) is a species of frog in the family Ceratobatrachidae.
It is endemic to the Cordillera Central of northern Luzon, Philippines. Its type locality is Mount Data.

Its natural habitat is subtropical or tropical moist montane forest.
It is threatened by habitat loss.

References

Amphibians of the Philippines
Platymantis
Endemic fauna of the Philippines
Fauna of Luzon
Taxonomy articles created by Polbot
Amphibians described in 1922